Madonna del Carmelo may refer to:

 Our Lady of Mount Carmel, a title given to the Blessed Virgin Mary in her role as patroness of the Carmelite Order
 Madonna del Carmelo, Regalbuto, a church in Regalbuto, Italy

See also 
 Madonna del Carmine (disambiguation)